The Tour du Cameroun is a cycling race held annually since 2003 in Cameroon. It is part of UCI Africa Tour and is rated a 2.2 event.

Winners

References

Cycle races in Cameroon
2003 establishments in Cameroon
Recurring sporting events established in 2003